"I'm So Tired..." (stylized in lowercase) is a song recorded by American singer Lauv and Australian singer-songwriter Troye Sivan. It was released on January 24, 2019, and was later featured as the lead single on Lauv's debut album, How I'm Feeling. The song reached number eight on the UK Singles Chart, becoming both artists' first top 10 there. It also reached the top 5 in Ireland, top 10 in New Zealand, and the top 15 in Australia.

Background

Sivan remembers "Fully flipping out" upon being shown the track by Lauv during a writing session.  The track went through several variations. At one point, the chorus featured four on the floor drum beats, although this version "felt really good". According to Sivan, it felt like a remix and that element was eventually dropped. Lauv would go on to call the single an "accidental duet" explaining " he [Sivan] just sounded too good singing it, so I think it was just natural to do the record together.".

Critical reception
Rolling Stone called the track a "snappy cut" that "dump[s] on modern lovelorn ballads like Coldplay's 'Hurts Like Heaven' and Lorde's 'Buzzcut Season'", with Lauv and Sivan singing about how they are "so tired of love songs". Lake Schatz of Consequence of Sound called it a "reflective, sobering listen".

Music videos
YouTube includes a visuallzer by Troye Sivan and a visualizer by Lauv. The difference between the two visualizers is that Lauv's version is 2 seconds longer than Troye Sivan's version. Also, Lauv drives the car in Troye Sivan's version, while Troye Sivan drives the car in Lauv's version.

A music video for the song was released on February 14, 2019, or Valentine's Day. It shows the two singing and getting in the middle of a dating couple, while still unnoticed. In the end, Lauv slams the car's door, starting a car alarm and gaining their attention while walking away.

Charts

Weekly charts

Year-end charts

Certifications

References

2019 singles
2019 songs
Lauv songs
Songs written by Lauv
Songs written by Troye Sivan
Songs written by Leland (musician)
Songs written by Michael Pollack (musician)